Francisco Morazan was a  cargo ship that was built in 1922 as Arcadia by Deutsche Werft, Hamburg, for German owners. She was sold in 1934 and renamed Elbing. She was seized by the Allies in the River Elbe, Germany in May 1945, passed to the United Kingdom's Ministry of War Transport and renamed Empire Congress. In 1946, she was allocated to the Norwegian Government and renamed Brunes.

Brunes was sold into merchant service in 1947 and renamed Skuld. In 1948, another sale saw her renamed Ringås. In 1958, she was sold to Liberia and renamed Los Mayas and then Francisco Morazan (for Francisco Morazán) the following year. She served until 29 November 1960 when she ran aground in Lake Michigan and was declared a total loss.

Description
The ship was built in 1922 by Deutsche Werft AG, Hamburg, as yard number 19.

She had a GRT of 1,141 and a NRT of 747,  with a DWT of 2,097.

As built, she was propelled by two steam turbines, double reduction geared, driving a single screw propeller. The turbines were built by Allgemeine Elektrizitäts-Gesellschaft, Berlin.

History
Arcadia was built for Hamburg Amerikanische Packetfahrt AG, Hamburg.  She was launched In June 1922. Arcadia was operated under the management of Deutsche Levant Linie AG. Her port of registry was Hamburg and the Code Letters RCSM were allocated. In 1934, her Code Letters were changed to DHBK.

In 1934, Arcadia was sold to Kohlen-Import und Poseidon Schiffahrt, Königsberg and was renamed Elbing. A new four-cylinder compound steam engine was fitted in 1935.

In 1940, Elbing was requisitioned by the Kriegsmarine for use as a coal ship in Operation Sea Lion. In March 1941 she was set on fire after being shelled by  during Operation Claymore and beached at Solvær, Lofoten Islands, Norway. Subsequently, repaired, she saw service in Norwegian waters in 1942 and was returned to Kohlen-Import und Poseidon Schiffahrt in 1943. In 1945, her port of registry was changed to Nordenham. She was damaged after being shelled by land-based artillery and beached on Schweinesand island. In May 1945, Elbing was seized in the River Elbe. She was passed to the MoWT and renamed Empire Congress. Her port of registry was changed to London. The Code Letters GFSV and United Kingdom Official Number 180691 were allocated. She was placed under the management of Chine Trading Co Ltd, Cardiff.

In 1946, Empire Congress was allocated to the Norwegian government. She was renamed Brunes. She was operated under the management of Kr Jebsen. In 1947, she was sold to R Mithassel, Norway and renamed Skuld. In 1948, Mithassel was taken over by Birger Ekerholt and the ship was renamed Ringås. Ringås rescued the 46 crew and three passengers from Mahenge, which sank. Granville was badly damaged and set on fire. She was towed into Cherbourg, France after the fire had been extinguished. In 1952, Ringås made her first voyage to the Great Lakes, delivering a cargo of china clay to Muskegon, Michigan. In 1953, she delivered a cargo of pulpwood to Port Huron, Michigan. In 1958, Ringås was sold to a Greek owner and renamed Los Mayos. She was operated placed under the Panamanian Flag and operated under the management of Moa Navigation SA. Los Mayos visited the Great Lakes in 1958. She ran aground at Muskegon and was holed. In 1959, she was sold to C T Trapezountios, Monrovia, Liberia, and was renamed Francisco Morazan. She was operated by the West Indies Transport Company of New York and Monrovia and chartered to Interamerican Marine Operators, New York.

Loss

On 21 October 1960, Francisco Morazan began what was to be her last voyage from Miami, Florida. She sailed to Montreal and Toronto, where she unloaded a cargo of phosphates. Francisco Morazan then sailed to Chicago, arriving there in mid-November. At Chicago, 1,118 tons, 10 cwt of mixed cargo was loaded, destined for Rotterdam, Netherlands and Hamburg, Germany. The cargo included aluminium, baled hair, bottle caps, canned chicken, castings, chemicals, Gilsonite, hides, lard, machinery, phosphate, scrap metal, solder dross, tinplate, and toys. Francisco Morazan departed Chicago on 28 November. Fog on Lake Michigan slowed her progress and a problem with the feed pump for the boiler required the ship to be stopped while the pump was repaired. This meant Francisco Morazan was now in a race to leave the Great Lakes before the system closed to navigation on 3 December.

During the night of 28/29 November, a snowstorm greatly reduced visibility and the ship was pushed off course. She ended up just  from the shore. She was then airlifted to Traverse City, Michigan. The captain and 12 crew remained on board Francisco Morazan, which was not in danger of sinking. On 30 November, two people were flown out to the ship by the insurers. It was decided that Francisco Morazan was not salvageable, although it was thought possible to save her cargo. Roan Salvage of Sturgeon Bay, Wisconsin, were contracted for the recovery of the cargo. The salvage tug John Roan V and barge Maintland were sent to the scene. During the next five days, Francisco Morazan was buffeted by a storm and began to break up. All on board the ship were rescued on 4 December. Roan Salvage abandoned their intention to salvage the cargo and their ships returned to port.

Aftermath
In January 1961, representatives from the insurers of the cargo awarded a contract to Lake Michigan Hardwood Co. for the salvage of the cargo from Francisco Morazan. Lake Michigan Hardwood Co engaged George Grosvenor of Leland, Michigan to assist in the operation. Grosvenor owned a small mail boat, Smiling Thru which was able to operate in shallow water. The plan was that the salvaged cargo would be transferred from Smiling Thru to the Lake Michigan Hardwood Co's Glen Shore for delivery to Leland, from where it would be taken by road to Chicago. Only about 5 tons of canned chicken and hides were recovered before salvage was abandoned due to storms.

Over the years, part of the cargo was salvaged by the islanders for their own use. The Blue Star brand canned chicken was spoken highly of by the islanders. Amongst the cargo of toys were balsa wood model aircraft kits made by Monogram of Chicago, which proved popular with local boys. In August 1967, a local boy drowned while exploring the wreck of Francisco Morazan. In August 1968, Attorney General Frank Kelley filed a lawsuit to have the wreck of the ship removed. The following day, Francisco Morazan was found to be on fire and the cargo was entirely consumed. Two of the three defendants in the lawsuit disappeared and the lawsuit was later dropped. The wreck of Francisco Morazan is now the property of the State of Michigan.

References

External links
Shipwreck of the Francisco Morazan National Park Service

1922 ships
Ships built in Hamburg
Steamships of Germany
Merchant ships of Germany
World War II merchant ships of Germany
Auxiliary ships of the Kriegsmarine
Maritime incidents in March 1941
Maritime incidents in 1945
Ministry of War Transport ships
Empire ships
Steamships of the United Kingdom
Merchant ships of the United Kingdom
Steamships of Norway
Merchant ships of Norway
Steamships of Panama
Merchant ships of Panama
Steamships of Liberia
Merchant ships of Liberia
Maritime incidents in 1958
Maritime incidents in 1960
Wreck diving sites in the United States
Shipwrecks of Lake Michigan